Eratigena is a genus of spider in the family Agelenidae. Most of its species were moved from the genus Tegenaria in 2013. Which is what this genus is named after, being an anagram of Tegenaria. Two species that frequently build webs in and around human dwellings are now placed in this genus. Eratigena agrestis is the hobo spider, native to Europe and Central Asia, introduced to North America. Eratigena atrica is the giant house spider, native to Europe and also introduced into North America.

Description 
They are medium to large spiders. Two symmetrical dark bands are present dorsally on the carapace, which can be serrated (as pictured) or reduced, usually to three or four conspicuous triangles. They also have plumose hairs on the carapace, legs, and opisthosoma. Their rows of eyes are only slightly curved, in either direction.

Taxonomy

Phylogeny
Species now placed in the genus Eratigena were previously placed in Tegenaria and Malthonica. In 2013, a study was carried out on European house spiders in the "Tegenaria-Malthonica complex". Using both morphological and molecular data, the study found four well-supported clades, one of which constituted a new genus Eratigena, comprising species formerly placed in Tegenaria and Malthonica. The name Eratigena is an anagram of Tegenaria. (Some Tegenaria species had previously been separated into the new genus Aterigena, another anagram of Tegenaria.)

Although the genera involved in the study were consistently found to be monophyletic, different analyses found different relationships among them. Based on both morphological and DNA data, one hypothesis for the phylogeny of Eratigena and related genera is:

Identification
Bolzern et al. (2013) provide a key to the European agelenid genera. Eratigena can be differentiated from Malthonica by the un-notched trochanters on legs III and IV (notched in Malthonica). The genus differs from Tegenaria in the number and size of the teeth on the rear margin of the chelicerae. Eratigena has six or more teeth, with those closer to the body of the spider being smaller. Tegenaria has three to six large teeth, more or less equal in size.

Species
, the World Spider Catalog accepted the following species:

Eratigena agrestis (Walckenaer, 1802) – Europe to Central Asia, introduced into USA and Canada (hobo spider)
Eratigena arganoi (Brignoli, 1971) – Italy
Eratigena atrica (C. L. Koch, 1843) – Europe, introduced in North America (giant house spider)
Eratigena balearica (Brignoli, 1978) – Balearic Is.
Eratigena barrientosi (Bolzern, Crespo & Cardoso, 2009) – Portugal
Eratigena blanda (Gertsch, 1971) – Mexico
Eratigena bucculenta (L. Koch, 1868) – Portugal, Spain
Eratigena caverna (Gertsch, 1971) – Mexico
Eratigena decora (Gertsch, 1971) – Mexico
Eratigena duellica (Simon, 1875) – Canada, US, Europe
Eratigena edmundoi Bolzern & Hänggi, 2016 – Mexico
Eratigena feminea (Simon, 1870) – Portugal, Spain, Madeira, Algeria
Eratigena fernandoi Bolzern & Hänggi, 2016 – Mexico
Eratigena flexuosa (F. O. Pickard-Cambridge, 1902) – Mexico
Eratigena florea (Brignoli, 1974) – Mexico
Eratigena fuesslini (Pavesi, 1873) – Europe
Eratigena gertschi (Roth, 1968) – Mexico
Eratigena guanato Bolzern & Hänggi, 2016 – Mexico
Eratigena herculea (Fage, 1931) – Spain, Ibiza
Eratigena hispanica (Fage, 1931) – Spain
Eratigena incognita (Bolzern, Crespo & Cardoso, 2009) – Portugal
Eratigena inermis (Simon, 1870) – Portugal, Spain, France
Eratigena laksao Bolzern & Jäger, 2015 – Laos
Eratigena mexicana (Roth, 1968) – Mexico
Eratigena montigena (Simon, 1937) – Portugal, Spain
Eratigena picta (Simon, 1870) – Europe, Russia, North Africa
Eratigena queretaro Bolzern & Hänggi, 2016 – Mexico
Eratigena rothi (Gertsch, 1971) – Mexico
Eratigena saeva (Blackwall, 1844) – Western Europe, Canada 
Eratigena sardoa (Brignoli, 1977) – Sardinia
Eratigena selva (Roth, 1968) – Mexico
Eratigena sicana (Brignoli, 1976) – Sicily, Sardinia
Eratigena tlaxcala (Roth, 1968) – Mexico
Eratigena vidua (Cárdenas & Barrientos, 2011) – Spain
Eratigena vomeroi (Brignoli, 1977) – Italy
Eratigena xilitla Bolzern & Hänggi, 2016 – Mexico
Eratigena yarini Bolzern & Hänggi, 2016  – Mexico

See also

 House spider

References

Bibliography

External links
 
 

Agelenidae
Spiders of Asia
Araneomorphae genera